This is a list of notable alumni and faculty of Parsons School of Design in New York City.

Notable alumni

Design and Technology (MFA)

Fashion (BFA)

Fashion (AAS)

Film (BFA)

Fine Art (BFA or MFA)

Visual Communication and Graphic Design (BFA or BBA)

Illustration (BFA)

Music (MS)

Photography (BFA)

Uncategorized

Notable faculty

References 

Parsons School of Design
Parsons The New School
Parsons School of Design